Sisterhood is a 2021 Macedonian drama film directed by Dina Duma. It was selected as the Macedonian entry for the Best International Feature Film at the 94th Academy Awards.

Plot
Teenagers Maya and Yana are inseparable and do everything together. The assertive Gianna usually makes the decisions and Maya follows. One night at a party, the two catch Elena, the most popular girl at school, having sex with the boy who has been interested in Maya for a long time, and so they videotape them. Yana persuades Maya to share the video, but when it makes the rounds of the internet, Elena's life is ruined. An intense confrontation between the three girls leads to Elena's disappearance and Maya wants to go to the police. But Yana has something else in mind. An adult story about the breakup of a friendship between two teenage girls, which explores in detail the phenomenon of bullying on social media that spreads among the generation of teenagers.

Cast
 Antonija Belazelkoska as Maya
 Mia Giraud as Jana
 Marija Jancevska as Elena
 Hanis Bagashov as Kris

See also
 List of submissions to the 94th Academy Awards for Best International Feature Film
 List of Macedonian submissions for the Academy Award for Best International Feature Film

References

External links
 

2021 films
2021 drama films
Macedonian drama films
Macedonian-language films